, known professionally as Julius Arnest "J.A." Caesar (born 6 October 1948), is a Japanese film and theater music composer. Seazer enjoyed popularity among students in Japan during the 1960s, and worked closely with director Shuji Terayama and his theater Tenjo Sajiki until Terayama's death (besides incidental music, he wrote a few full-fledged rock operas for Tenjo Sajiki, including Shintokumaru). He is a member of the theatrical company , better known as just Ban'yū Inryoku. He gained more mainstream attention for his songs composed for the anime Revolutionary Girl Utena, and has also composed the score to the animated film adaptation of Suehiro Maruo's manga Mr. Arashi's Amazing Freak Show (also known as Midori or Shojo-tsubaki).

References

https://www.imdb.com/name/nm0780894/

1948 births
Japanese film score composers
Japanese male film score composers
Japanese musical theatre composers
Living people
Male musical theatre composers